Moszna-Wieś  is a village in the administrative district of Gmina Brwinów, within Pruszków County, Masovian Voivodeship, in east-central Poland.

The village has an approximate population of 250 people.

References

Villages in Pruszków County